Dalcerides flavetta is a moth in the family Dalceridae. It was described by Schaus in 1905. It is found in Venezuela, Guyana, Suriname, French Guiana, Colombia, Ecuador, Peru, Bolivia and northern Brazil. The habitat consists of tropical wet, tropical moist, tropical premontane wet, tropical premontane moist, subtropical moist and tropical dry forests.

The length of the forewings is 7–8.5 mm for males and 10 mm for females. Adults are yellow-orange, with the forewing veins and dorsal body slightly darker. Adults are on wing year-round.

References

Moths described in 1905
Dalceridae